In measure theory, Carathéodory's extension theorem (named after the mathematician Constantin Carathéodory) states that any pre-measure defined on a given ring of subsets R of  a given set Ω can be  extended to a measure on the σ-algebra generated by R, and this extension is unique if the pre-measure is σ-finite. Consequently, any pre-measure on a ring containing all intervals of real numbers can be extended to the Borel algebra of the set of real numbers. This is an extremely powerful result of measure theory, and leads, for example, to the Lebesgue measure.

The theorem is also sometimes known as the Carathéodory–Fréchet extension theorem, the Carathéodory–Hopf extension theorem, the Hopf extension theorem and the Hahn–Kolmogorov extension theorem.

Introductory statement
Several very similar statements of the theorem can be given. A slightly more involved one, based on semi-rings of sets, is given further down below. A shorter, simpler statement is as follows. In this form, it is often called the Hahn–Kolmogorov theorem.

Let  be an algebra of subsets of a set  Consider a set function 
 
which is finitely additive, meaning that 

for any positive integer  and  disjoint sets in 

Assume that this function satisfies the stronger sigma additivity assumption

for any disjoint family  of elements of  such that  (Functions  obeying these two properties are known as pre-measures.)  Then, 
 
such that its restriction to   coincides with 

If  is -finite, then the extension is unique.

Comments
This theorem is remarkable for it allows one to construct a measure by first defining it on a small algebra of sets, where its sigma additivity could be easy to verify, and then this theorem guarantees  its extension to a sigma-algebra. The proof of this theorem is not trivial, since it requires extending  from an algebra of sets to a potentially much bigger sigma-algebra, guaranteeing that the extension is unique (if  is -finite), and moreover that it does not fail to satisfy the sigma-additivity of the original function.

Semi-ring and ring

Definitions
For a given set  we call a family  of subsets of  a  if it has the following properties:

 
 For all  we have  (closed under pairwise intersections)
 For all  there exist disjoint sets  such that  (relative complements can be written as finite disjoint unions).

The first property can be replaced with  since 

With the same notation, we call a family  of subsets of  a  if it has the following properties:

 
 For all  we have  (closed under pairwise unions)
 For all  we have  (closed under relative complements).

Sometimes, the following constraint is added in the measure theory context:

  is the disjoint union of a countable family of sets in 

A field of sets (respectively, a semi-field) is a ring (respectively, a semi-ring) that also contains  as one of its elements.

Properties
 A content  defined on a semi-ring  can be extended on the ring generated by   Such an extension is unique.

Motivation

In measure theory, we are not interested in semi-rings and rings themselves, but rather in σ-algebras generated by them. As σ-algebras generated by semi-rings and rings are the same, the difference does not really matter (in the measure theory context at least). Actually, Carathéodory's extension theorem can be slightly generalized by replacing ring by semi-field.

The definition of semi-ring may seem a bit convoluted, but the following example shows why it is useful (moreover it allows us to give an explicit representation of the smallest ring containing some semi-ring).

Example
Think about the subset of   defined by the set of all half-open intervals  for a and b reals. This is a semi-ring, but not a ring. Stieltjes measures are defined on intervals; the countable additivity on the semi-ring is not too difficult to prove because we only consider countable unions of intervals which are intervals themselves. Proving it for arbitrary countable unions of intervals is accomplished using Caratheodory's theorem.

Statement of the theorem

Proof sketch

 
and then restrict it to the set  of -measurable sets (that is, Carathéodory-measurable sets), which is the set of all  such that  for every 

This is done by basic measure theory techniques of dividing and adding up sets.

For uniqueness, take any other extension  so it remains to show that  By -additivity, uniqueness can be reduced to the case where  is finite, which will now be assumed.

Examples of non-uniqueness of extension

There can be more than one extension of a pre-measure to the generated σ-algebra, if the pre-measure is not sigma-finite.

Via the counting measure
Take the algebra generated by all half-open intervals [a,b) on the real line, and give such intervals measure infinity if they are non-empty. The Carathéodory extension gives all non-empty sets measure infinity. Another extension is given by the counting measure.

Via rationals
This example is a more detailed variation of the above.

It is easy to prove that  is, in fact, an algebra.

Note that, in this case, the two extensions are -finite, because  is countable.

Via Fubini's theorem
Another example is closely related to the failure of some forms of Fubini's theorem for spaces that are not σ-finite.
This has a very large number of different extensions to a measure; for example:
The measure of a subset is the sum of the measures of its horizontal sections. This is the smallest possible extension. Here the diagonal has measure 0.
The measure of a subset is  where  is the number of points of the subset with given -coordinate. The diagonal has measure 1.
The Carathéodory extension, which is the largest possible extension. Any subset of finite measure is contained in some union of a countable number of horizontal lines. In particular the diagonal has measure infinity.

See also
 Outer measure: the proof of Carathéodory's extension theorem is based upon the outer measure concept.
 Loeb measures, constructed using Carathéodory's extension theorem.

References

Theorems in measure theory